The Rainer Case is a 1942 German drama film directed by Paul Verhoeven and starring Luise Ullrich, Paul Hubschmid and Karl Schönböck.

The film's sets were designed by the art director Franz Bi and Botho Hoefer. It was partly shot on location around Admont in Austria. The film is set in 1918 during the closing stages of the First World War.

Main cast

References

Bibliography 
 Bock, Hans-Michael & Bergfelder, Tim. The Concise CineGraph. Encyclopedia of German Cinema. Berghahn Books, 2009.

External links 
 

1942 films
1942 drama films
German drama films
Films of Nazi Germany
1940s German-language films
Films directed by Paul Verhoeven (Germany)
Films shot in Austria
Films set in 1918
Films based on German novels
Tobis Film films
German black-and-white films
1940s German films